The Founders Peaks are a cluster of sharp peaks and ridges located just east of Founders Escarpment and between Minnesota Glacier and Gowan Glacier, in the Heritage Range of the Ellsworth Mountains in Antarctica. The peaks were mapped by the United States Geological Survey from surveys and U.S. Navy air photos, 1961–66. The name was applied by the Advisory Committee on Antarctic Names is association with the name Heritage Range.

See also
 Mountains in Antarctica

Geographical features include:

Smith Ridge

Other features

 Gowan Glacier
 Minnesota Glacier
 Muir Peak
 Pipe Peak
 Reuther Nunataks
 Webster Glacier
 Welcome Nunatak
 Windy Peak

References 

Ellsworth Mountains
Mountains of Ellsworth Land